This is a list of law enforcement agencies in the Commonwealth of Kentucky.

According to the US Bureau of Justice Statistics' 2008 Census of State and Local Law Enforcement Agencies, the state had 389 law enforcement agencies employing 7,833 sworn police officers, about 183 for each 100,000 residents.

State agencies

Kentucky Department of Fish and Wildlife Resources
 Kentucky State Conservation Officers
Kentucky Department of Parks 
 Kentucky State Park Rangers
Kentucky Horse Park Police
 Kentucky Justice and Public Safety Cabinet 
 Kentucky Department of Corrections
 Kentucky Department of Juvenile Justice
Kentucky State Police
Division of Commercial Vehicle Enforcement
Facilities Security Branch
 Kentucky Office of the Attorney General
Kentucky Department of Criminal Investigation
 Kentucky Public Protection Cabinet
Kentucky Department of Charitable Gaming Enforcement
Kentucky Department of Alcoholic Beverage Control

County agencies
 Adair County Sheriff's Office
 Adair County Constable
 Adair County Constable District 1
 Adair County Constable District 2
 Adair County Constable District 3
 Adair County Constable District 4
 Adair County Constable District 5
 Adair County Constable District 6
 Adair County Constable District 7
 Allen County Sheriff's Office
 Allen County Constable
 Allen County Constable District 1
 Allen County Constable District 2
 Allen County Constable District 3
 Allen County Constable District 4
 Allen County Constable District 5
 Anderson County Sheriff's Office
 Anderson County Constable
 Anderson County Constable District 1
 Anderson County Constable District 2
 Anderson County Constable District 3
 Anderson County Constable District 4
 Anderson County Constable District 5
 Anderson County Constable District 6
 Ballard County Sheriff's Office
 Ballard County Constable
 Ballard County Constable District 2
 Ballard County Constable District 3
 Ballard County Constable District 5
 Barren County Sheriff's Office
 Barren County Constable
 Barren County Constable District 1
 Barren County Constable District 2
 Barren County Constable District 3
 Barren County Constable District 4
 Barren County Constable District 5
 Barren County Constable District 6
 Barren County Constable District 7
 Bath County Sheriff's Office
 Bath County Constable
 Bath County Constable District 1
 Bath County Constable District 2
 Bath County Constable District 3
 Bell County Sheriff's Office
 Boone County Sheriffs Office 
 Boone County Constable
 Boone County Constable District 1
 Boone County Constable District 2
 Boone County Constable District 3
 Bourbon County Sheriff's Office
 Bourbon County Constable
 Bourbon County Constable District 1
 Bourbon County Constable District 5
 Boyd County Sheriff's Office
 Boyd County Detention Center
 Boyle County Sheriff's Office
 Bracken County Sheriff's Office
 Breathitt County Sheriff's Office
 Breckinridge County Sheriff's Office
 Bullitt County Sheriff's Office
 Bullitt County Detention Center
 Butler County Sheriff's Office
 Caldwell County Sheriff's Office
 Calloway County Sheriff's Department
 Campbell County Sheriff's Office
 Campbell County Constables 
 Carlisle County Sheriff's Office
 Carroll County Sheriff's Office
 Carter County Sheriff's Office
 Carter County Detention Center
 Casey County Sheriff's Office
 Christian County Sheriff's Office
 Christian County Constable
 Christian County Constable District 1
 Christian County Constable District 2
 Christian County Constable District 3
 Christian County Constable District 4
 Christian County Constable District 5
 Christian County Constable District 6
 Christian County Constable District 7
 Christian County Constable District 8
 Clark County Sheriff's Office
 Clay County Sheriff's Office
 Clay County Constable District 6
 Clinton County Sheriff's Office
 Crittenden County Sheriff's Office
 Cumberland County Sheriff's Office
 Daviess County Sheriff's Office
 Edmonson County Sheriff's Office
 Elliott County Sheriff's Office
 Estill County Sheriff's Office
 Fayette County Sheriff's Office
 Fayette County Constable
 Fayette County Constable District 1
 Fayette County Constable District 2
 Fayette County Constable District 3 
 Fleming County Sheriff's Office
 Fleming County Constables Office
 Floyd County Sheriff's Office
 Floyd County Detention Center
 Franklin County Sheriff's Office
 Franklin County Detention Center
 Franklin County Constables Office
 Fulton County Sheriff's Office
 Gallatin County Sheriff's Office
 Garrard County Sheriff's Office
 Garrard County Police Department
 Grant County Sheriff's Office
 Grant County Detention Center
 Graves County Sheriff's Office
 Grayson County Sheriff's Office
 Green County Sheriff's Office
 Greenup County Sheriff's Office
 Greenup County Detention Center
 Hancock County Sheriff's Office
 Hardin County Sheriff's Department
 Harlan County Sheriff's Department
 Harrison County Sheriff's Office
 Harrison County Constable
 Harrison County Constable District 3
 Harrison County Constable District 4
 Harrison County Constable District 5
 Hart County Sheriff's Office
 Henderson County Sheriff's Office
 Henry County Sheriff's Office
 Hickman County Sheriff's Office
 Hopkins County Sheriff's Office
 Hopkins County Constable
 Hopkins County Constable District 1
 Hopkins County Constable District 2
 Hopkins County Constable District 3
 Hopkins County Constable District 4
 Hopkins County Constable District 5
 Hopkins County Constable District 6
 Hopkins County Constable District 7
 Jackson County Sheriff's Office
 Jefferson County Sheriff's Office
 Jefferson County Constable
 Jefferson County Constable District 1
 Jefferson County Constable District 2
 Jefferson County Constable District 3
 Jessamine County Sheriff's Office
 Jessamine County Constable
 Jessamine County Constable District 1
 Jessamine County Constable District 2
 Jessamine County Constable District 3
 Jessamine County Constable District 4
 Jessamine County Constable District 5
 Jessamine County Constable District 6
 Johnson County Sheriff's Office
 Johnson County Constable
 Johnson County Constable District 1
 Johnson County Constable District 2
 Kenton County Sheriff's Office
 Knott County Sheriff's Office (Kentucky) Knott County Sheriff's Office
 Knott County Constable (Kentucky) Knott County Constable ** District 1 (Kentucky) Knott County Constable District 1
 Knox County Sheriff's Office
 Knox County Constable
 Knox County Constable District 1
 Knox County Constable District 2
 Knox County Constable District 3
 Knox County Constable District 4
 Knox County Constable District 5
 LaRue County Sheriff's Office
 Laurel County Sheriff's Office
 Lawrence County Sheriff's Office
 Lee County Sheriff's Office
 Leslie County Sheriff's Office
 Letcher County Sheriff's Office
 Lewis County Sheriff's Office
 Lewis County Detention Center
 Lincoln County Sheriff's Office
 Livingston County Constable District 4
 Livingston County Sheriff's Office
 Logan County Sheriff's Office
 Lyon County Sheriff's Office
 Madison County Sheriff's Office
 Madison County Detention Center
 Madison County Constable
 Madison County Constable District 1
 Madison County Constable District 2
 Madison County Constable District 3
 Madison County Constable District 4
 Magoffin County Sheriff's Office
 Marion County Sheriff's Office
 Marshall County Sheriff's Office
 Martin County Sheriff's Office
 Martin County Constable
 Martin County Constable District 1
 Martin County Constable District 2
 Martin County Constable District 3
 Martin County Constable District 4
 Martin County Constable District 5
 Mason County Sheriff's Office
 McCracken County Sheriff's Department
 McCreary County Sheriff's Office          
 McLean County Sheriff's Department
 Meade County Sheriff's Department
 Menifee County Sheriff's Office
 Mercer County Sheriff's Office
 Metcalfe County Sheriff's Office
 Monroe County Sheriff's Office
 Montgomery County Sheriff's Office
 Morgan County Sheriff's Office
 Muhlenberg County Sheriff's Office
 Nelson County Sheriff's Office
 Nicholas County Sheriff's Office
 Ohio County Sheriff's Office
 Oldham County Sheriff's Department
 Owen County Sheriff's Office
 Owsley County Sheriff's Office
 Pendleton County Sheriff's Office
 Perry County Sheriff's Office
 Pike County Sheriff's Office
 Powell County Sheriff's Office
 Pulaski County Sheriff's Office
 Robertson County Sheriff's Office
 Robertson County Constables
 Rockcastle County Sheriff's Office
 Rowan County Sheriff's Office
 Rowan County Detention Center
 Russell County Sheriff's Office
 Scott County Sheriff's Office
 Scott County Detention Center
 Shelby County Sheriff's Office
 Simpson County Sheriff's Office
 Spencer County Sheriff's Office
 Taylor County Sheriff's Office
 Todd County Sheriff's Office
 Trigg County Sheriff's Office
 Trimble County Sheriff's Office
 Union County Sheriff's Office
 Warren County Sheriff's Office
 Washington County Sheriff's Office
 Wayne County Sheriff's Office
 Webster County Sheriff's Office
 Whitley County Sheriff's Office
 Whitley County Detention Center
 Wolfe County Sheriff's Department
 Woodford County Sheriff's Office

City agencies

 Adairville Police Department
 Albany Police Department
 Alexandria Police Department
 Ashland Police Department
 Auburn Police Department 
 Audubon Park Police Department 
 Augusta Police Department
 Barbourville Police Department 
 Bardstown Police Department 
 Barlow Police Department 
 Beattyville Police Department
 Bellefonte Police Department
 Bellevue Police Department 
 Benton Police Department 
 Benham Police Department
 Berea Police Department
 Bluegrass Army Depot Police Department
 Bowling Green Police Department 
 Brandenburg Police Department
 Brooksville Police Department
 Butler Police Department
 Calvert City Police Department
 Carrollton Police Department
 Catlettsburg Police Department
 Central City Police Department 
 Coal Run Village Police Department
 Cold Springs Police Department 
 Corbin Police Department
 Covington Police Department
 Cynthiana Police Department 
 Danville Police Department
 Dayton Police Department
 Drakesboro Police Department
 Dry Ridge Police Department
 Edgewood Police Department
 Elkhorn City Police Department
 Elkhown Police Department
 Elizabethtown Police Department
 Elsmere Police Department
 Erlanger Police Department
 Falmouth Police Department
 Flatwoods Police Department
 Florence Police Department
 Fort Mitchell Police Department
 Fort Thomas Police Department 
 Fort Wright Police Department 
 Frankfort Police Department
Fulton Police Department
 Georgetown Police Department
 Glasgow Police Department
 Graymoor-Devondale Police Department
 Greenup Police Department
 Harrodsburg Police Department
 Hartford Police Department
 Hazard Police Department
 Henderson Police Department
 Heritage Creek Police Department
 Highland Heights Police Department
 Hillview Police Department
 Hodgenville Police Department
 Hollow Creek Police Department
 Hopkinsville Police Department
 Horse Cave Police Department
 Hurstbourne Acres Police Department
 Grayson Police Department
 Greenup Police Department
 Greenville Police Department

 Independence Police Department
 Indian Hills Police Department
 Jeffersontown Police Department
 LaGrange Police Department
 Lakeside Park/Crestview Hills Police Authority
Lexington Police Department
 Lincolnshire Police Department
 London Police Department
 Ludlow Police Department
 Louisa Police Department
 Louisville Metro Police Department
 Lynnview Police Department
 Madisonville Police Department
 Meadowvale Inter-Local Police Department
 Middlesboro Police Department
 Morehead Police Department
 Morgantown Police Department
 Mount Washington Police Department
 Mt. Olivet Police Department
 Muldraugh Police Department
 Neon Police Department
 Newport Police Department
 Nicholasville Police Department
 Northfield Police Department
 Olive Hill Police Department
 Owensboro Police Department
 Owenton Police Department
 Owingsville Police Department
 Paducah Police Department
 Park Hills Police Department
 Pioneer Village Police Department
 Pikeville Police Department
 Pineville Police Department
 Pippa Passes Police Department
 Powderly Police Department
 Prestonsburg Police Department
 Providence Police Department
 Raceland Police Department
 Radcliff Police Department
 Richmond Police Department
 Russell Police Department
 Sadieville Police Department
 Saint Matthews Police Department
 Shepherdsville Police Department
 Shively Police Department
 Silver Grove Police Department
 Simpsonville Police Department
 Southgate Police Department
 South Shore Police Department
 Stamping Ground Police Department
 Strathmoore Police Department
 Stanford Police Department
 Taylor Mill Police Department
 Taylorsville Police Department
 Vanceburg Police Department
 Versailles Police Department
 Villa Hills Police Department
 Vine Grove Police Department
 West Buechel Police Department
 Wilder Police Department
 Wilmore Police Department
 Williamsburg Police Department
 Williamstown Police Department
 Winchester Police Department
 Woodlawn Park Police Department
 Worthington Police Department
 Wheelwright Police Department

Airport police
 Blue Grass Airport Police/Public Safety Department
 Cincinnati/Northern Kentucky Intl. Airport Police Department
 Louisville Int'l/Regional Airport Authority Public Safety

County police
 Campbell County Police Department
 Kenton County Police Department 
 Oldham County Police Department
 Garrard County Police Department

Community corrections
Kenton County Detention Center
 Lexington-Fayette Urban County Division of Community Corrections
 Louisville Metro Department of Corrections
 Warren County Regional Juvenile Detention Center

University agencies
Eastern Kentucky University Police Department
Kentucky State University Police Department
Morehead State University Police Department
Murray State University Police Department
Northern Kentucky University Police Department
 Transylvania University Public Safety
University of Kentucky Police Department
University of Louisville Police Department
University of Pikeville Public Safety
Western Kentucky University Police Department
Southern Baptist Theological Seminary Police Department

Public schools police
 Fayette County Public Schools Police Department

Railroad police
 Amtrak Police
 CSX Transportation Railroad Police
 Norfolk Southern Railway Police
 RJ Corman Railroad Police

Specialized police agencies
 Tennessee Valley Authority Police Department
 Kentucky Marijuana Strike Force

Law enforcement training academies
 Department of Criminal Justice Training Academy
 Lexington/Fayette Urban County Police Department Academy 
 Kentucky State Police Academy 
 Kentucky DOC Eastern Region Training Center
 Louisville Metro Police Training Academy
 Bowling Green Training Academy

Defunct agencies
Allen Police Department
 Boone County Police Department 
 Boyd County Police Department
 Bromley Police Department
 Crescent Springs Police Department
 Crescent Park Police Department
 Dixie Police Authority
 Eden Police Department 
 Fayette County Police Department
 Highland Heights/Southgate Police Authority
 Houston Acres Police Department
 Inez Police Department
 Jefferson County Police Department
 Jefferson County Public Schools Police
Kentucky Christian College Police Department
Kentucky Highway Patrol
Latonia Police Department
 Lexington Division of Police 
 Louisville Police Department
Millersburg Police Department
 Rolling Hills Police Department
 South Fort Mitchell Police Department
 Walton Police Department
 Woodford County Police Department
Wurtland Police Department

References

Kentucky
Law enforcement agencies of Kentucky
Law enforcement agencies